Dread is a Reddit-like dark web discussion forum featuring news and discussions around darknet markets. The site's administrators go by the alias of Paris and HugBunter.

History 

Dread is a popular community hub which has been described as a "Reddit-style forum" and the successor of the seized DeepDotWeb for discussion around market law enforcement activity and scams. It came to prominence in 2018 after Reddit banned several darknet market discussion communities, rapidly reaching 12,000 registered users within three months of being launched, and 14,683 users by June 2018. In September 2019, HugBunter's dead man's switch was triggered, accompanied by a weeks-long absence, signifying the temporary loss of control over the site. The site would be reinstated in November, with a revamped user interface, and remains active as of September 2022. It became known that the cause of the outage was a server failure, according to HugBunter, despite rumors concerning a potential compromising from a third party or law-enforcement authority.

Activities 

In May 2019 a moderator of Wall Street Market posted its hidden IP address to Dread, potentially leading to its exit scam and seizure shortly after. Stolen data is sometimes sold via Dread. The site features in-depth guides around manufacture of illegal drugs. The shutdown of Dream Market was announced on Dread in March 2019. Major denial-of-service attacks have been launched against Dread and other markets exploiting a vulnerability in the Tor protocol.

References 

Dark web
Darknet markets
Internet properties established in 2018
Tor onion services
Internet forums